Ring finger protein 183 is a protein in humans that is encoded by the RNF183 gene.

References

Further reading 

Genes on human chromosome 9
RING finger proteins